The 1984 South African Open  was a tennis tournament played on indoor hard courts in Johannesburg, South Africa that was part of the 1984 Volvo Grand Prix and the 1984 Virginia Slims World Championship Series. It was the 81st edition of the tournament. The women's tournament was held from 30 April through 6 May 1984 while the men's tournament was held from 19 November through 25 November 1984.

Finals

Men's singles
 Eliot Teltscher defeated  Vitas Gerulaitis 6–3, 6–1, 7–6
It was Teltscher's 2nd title of the year and the 13th of his career.

Women's singles
 Chris Evert defeated  Andrea Jaeger 6–3, 6–0
 It was Evert's 3rd title of the year and the 150th of her career.

Men's doubles
 Tracy Delatte /  Francisco Gonzalez defeated  Steve Meister /  Eliot Teltscher 7–6, 6–1
It was Delatte's only title of the year and the 3rd of his career. It was Gonzalez's 2nd title of the year and the 8th of his career.

Women's doubles
 Rosalyn Fairbank /  Beverly Mould defeated  Sandy Collins /  Andrea Leand 6–1, 6–2 
 It was Fairbank's 1st title of the year and the 10th of her career. It was Mould's 1st title of the year and the 3rd of her career.

References

External links
 ITF – Johannesburg Tournament Details

South African Open
South African Open
South African Open (tennis)
Open
Sports competitions in Johannesburg
1980s in Johannesburg
November 1984 sports events in Africa
April 1984 sports events in Africa
May 1984 sports events in Africa